Merritt Warren Kersey (born February 22, 1950) is a former American football punter who played for the Philadelphia Eagles of the National Football League (NFL). He played college football at West Chester University.

He was primarily a punter but also played running back in college.

Professional career 
After going undrafted in 1974, Kersey spent his entire rookie season starting for the Philadelphia Eagles. He punted 82 times for 2,959 yards. He was also named the starter in year two with the Eagles. However, he was replaced after starting in two games. In 1976 after his release, he signed with the Buffalo Bills, but did not play a game with them. During the 1977 preseason, he competed for the Washington Redskins starting job. He did not make the final roster. In 1978, he battled fellow punter Craig Colquitt for the Pittsburgh Steelers starting job. But he was, once again, cut and did not play a game for them.

References 

1950 births
Living people
American football punters
Philadelphia Eagles players
Pittsburgh Steelers players
Buffalo Bills players
Washington Redskins players
American football running backs